Geoffrey W. Bromiley (1915–2009) was an ecclesiastical historian and historical theologian. He was professor emeritus at Fuller Theological Seminary, "having been
Professor of Church History and Historical Theology there from 1958 until his retirement in 1987."

Biography 
"Bromiley, born in Bromley Cross, Lancashire, England, in 1915. Bromiley died on 7 August 2009.

Education 
Bromiley earned his MA at Cambridge University and his PhD, DLitt, and DD at the University of Edinburgh.

Academic work 
Ordained in the Church of England, Bromiley served from 1951 to 1958 as Rector of St. Thomas’s Church, Edinburgh. In 1958, he accepted the appointment as Professor of Church History and Historical Theology at Fuller, where he served until his retirement in 1987."

Writings 
 The Baptism of Infants, 1955, 1976 & 1977, Vine Books (Out of print, but now available online  through the Church Society website)
 Children of Promise: The Case for Baptizing Infants, 1979, Eerdmans, 
 God and Marriage, 1980, Eerdmans, 
 Historical Theology: An Introduction, 2000, T & T Clark, 
 Introduction to the Theology of Karl Barth, 2000, T & T Clark, 
 Sacramental Teaching and Practice in the Reformation Churches, 1957, Eerdmans,  

Bromiley also co-edited the English translation of Karl Barth's Church Dogmatics series with T. F. Torrance.

Whilst not all his original work, Bromiley is also listed as Author of the Fully Revised Edition of.

References

External links 
 Fuller Mourns the Loss of Geoffrey Bromiley
 Geoffrey Bromiley, Christianity Today
 Geoffrey Bromiley at TheologicalStudies
 The Baptism of Infants  at Church Society

Online writings 
 Only God is Free, Christianity Today, Feb 2002

1915 births
2009 deaths
20th-century Anglican theologians
20th-century British historians
Alumni of the University of Cambridge
Alumni of the University of Edinburgh
Fuller Theological Seminary faculty
British Anglican theologians
British Christian theologians
Evangelical Anglican theologians
Historians of Christianity
British historians of religion
People from Turton